Record and replay debugging is the process of recording the execution of a software program so that it may be played back within a debugger to help diagnose and resolve defects. The concept is analogous to the use of a flight data recorder to diagnose the cause of an airplane flight malfunction.

Recording and replaying 
Record and replay debuggers record application state at every step of the program's process and thread execution, including memory interactions, deterministic and non-deterministic inputs, system resource status, and store it to disk in a log. The recording allows the program to be replayed again and again, and debugged exactly as it happened.

Usage 
Recordings can be made in one location and replayed in another, which makes it useful for remote debugging.

Record and replay debugging is particularly useful for debugging intermittent and non-deterministic defects, which can be difficult to reproduce.

Record and replay debugging technology is often fundamental to reverse debugging and time travel debugging.

Record and replay debuggers 
 GDB (GNU)
 LiveRecorder (Undo)
 rr (Mozilla)
 TotalView's ReplayEngine (RogueWave)
 PyTrace for Python

References 

Debuggers